Richard David Rooney (August 13, 1937 – November 9, 2006) was a Canadian politician.

Born in Lower Island Cove, Newfoundland and Labrador, he was a teacher before being elected to the House of Commons of Canada for the riding of Bonavista—Trinity—Conception in the 1972 federal election. A Liberal, he was re-elected three more times in 1974, 1979, and 1980 before being defeated in the 1984 election.

External links
 

1937 births
2006 deaths
Liberal Party of Canada MPs
Members of the House of Commons of Canada from Newfoundland and Labrador